Tirtol (Sl. No.: 102) is a Vidhan Sabha constituency of Jagatsinghpur district, Odisha.

This constituency includes Biridi block and Raghunathpur block and 20 Gram panchayats (Biritol, Bishunpur, Dainlo, Garam, Gobindapur, Gopalpur, Gopalpur (Sankheswar), Ibrisingh, Jagannathpur, Kanakpur, Kanimula, Katara, Kostimallikapur, Krushnanandpur, Mulisingh, Patilo, Sanara, Tarajanga, Tirtol and Tulanga) of Tirtol block.

Elected Members

Fifteen elections were held between 1951 and 2019.
Elected members from the Tirtol constituency are:

2019: (102): Bishnu Charan Das (BJD)
2014: (102): Rajashree Mallick (BJD)
2009: (102): Rabindra Nath Bhoi (BJD)
2004: (35): Chiranjib Biswal (Congress)
2000: (35): Debashish Samantaray (BJD)
1995: (35): Basanta Kumar Biswal (Congress)
1990: (35): Basanta Kumar Biswal (Congress)
1985: (35): Nityananda Samanaray (Congress)
1980: (35): Basanta Kumar Biswal (Congress-I)
1977: (35): Pratap Chandra Mohanty (Janata Party)
1974: (35): Pratap Chandra Mohanty (UTC)
1971: (33): Pratap Chandra Mohanty (UTC)
1967: (33): Nishamani Khuntia (PSP)
1961: (108): Pratap Chandra Mohanty (Congress)
1957: (76): Nishamani Khuntia (PSP)
1951: (71): Nishamani Khuntia (Congress)

2020 By-election

 

 -->

2014 Election Candidates
In 2014 election, Biju Janata Dal candidate Rajashree Mallick defeated Indian National Congress candidate Rajkishore Behera by a margin of 35,448 votes.

2009 Election Results
In 2009 election, Biju Janata Dal candidate Rabindra Nath Bhoi defeated Indian National Congress candidate Rajkishore Das by a margin of 34,182 votes.

Notes

References

Assembly constituencies of Odisha
Jagatsinghpur district